Gus is a masculine name, often a diminutive for Angus, August, Augustine, or Augustus, and other names (e.g. Aengus, Argus, Fergus, Ghassan, Gustav, Gustave, Gustafson, Gustavo, Gussie).

It can also be used as the adaptation into English of the popular Greek name (of Latin origin) Kostas or Konstantinos (Constantin), especially amongst Greek immigrants in English-speaking countries, probably due to similarity in the sound.

Gus may refer to:

People

Given name
 Gus Arnheim (1897–1955), American pianist, bandleader and songwriter
 Gus Edwards (vaudeville) (1878–1945), German-born American songwriter, vaudevillian and music producer, born Gustave Schmelowsky
 Gus Edwards (American football) (born 1995), American football player
 Gus Hall (1910–2000), longtime leader of the Communist Party USA, born Arvo Kustaa Halberg
 Gus Johnson (basketball) (1938–1987), American National Basketball Association player
 Gus Johnson (jazz musician) (1913–2000), American jazz drummer
 Gus McNaughton (1881-1969), British actor
 Gus Pepa (born 1967), founding member of thrash metal band Death Angel
 Gus Triandos (born 1930), former Major League Baseball player
 Gus Van Sant (born 1952), American film director, photographer, musician and author
 Gus Weinberg (c. 1865–1952), actor, writer, and composer appearing in early-twentieth-century American films
 Gus Williams (basketball) (born 1953), American basketball player
 Gus Williams (musician) (1937–2010), Australian country singer, born Kasper Gus Ntjalka Williams
 Gus Zernial (1923–2011), American Major League Baseball player

Nickname
 Greg Adams (ice hockey, born 1963), Canadian former National Hockey League player
 Gus Bell (1928–1995), American Major League Baseball player
 Gus Cannon (1883–1979), American blues musician
 Gus Dorner (1876–1956), American Major League Baseball pitcher
 Gus Frerotte (born 1971), American football player
 Phil Gould (born 1958), Australian rugby league broadcaster, journalist, administrator and former player and coach
 Gus Greenlee (1893–1952), Negro league baseball team owner and African-American businessman
 Gus Grissom (1926–1967), one of the seven original American astronauts, killed in the Apollo 1 fire
 Gus Hansen (born 1974), professional Danish poker player
 Gus Henderson (1889–1965), American football coach
 Gustav A. Hoff (1852–1930), German-born American businessman and politician
 Gus Johnson (sportscaster) (born 1967), American sports announcer
 Gus Johnson (comedian) (born 1995), Youtube Personality and comedian
 Gus Kahn (1886–1941), American songwriter, lyricist and musician
 Gus Kelly (1877–1951), Irish cricketer
 Gus Kenworthy (born 1991), British-born American freestyle skier, 2014 Olympic silver medalist
 Gus Ketchum (1897–1980), American professional baseball pitcher with the 1922 Philadelphia Athletics
 Gus MacPherson (born 1968), Scottish football manager and former player
 Gus Mancuso (1905–1984), American baseball player, coach, scout and radio sports commentator
 Gus Mears (1873–1912), English businessman and founder of Chelsea F.C.
 Gus Meins (1893-1940), German-American director
 Gus Mortson (born 1924), former National Hockey League defenceman
 Gus O'Donnell, Baron O'Donnell (born 1952), British former senior civil servant and economist
 Gus Poyet (born 1967), Uruguayan former footballer
 Gus Sorola (born 1978), American actor, Founding member of Rooster Teeth
 Gus Suhr (1906–2004), American Major League Baseball player
 Gus Weyhing (1866–1955), American Major League Baseball pitcher
 Gus Williams (vaudeville) (1848–1915), American comedian and songwriter
 Gus Williams (outfielder) (1888–1964), German-American Major League Baseball player
 Gus Williams (pitcher) (1870–1890), Major League Baseball pitcher
 Gus Winckel (1912–2013), Dutch World War II soldier
 Gus Yatron (1927–2003), twelve-term member of the United States House of Representatives from Pennsylvania

Stage name
 Gus Black, singer-songwriter Anthony Penaloza, formerly known simply as Gus
 Gus G or Gus Gus, Greek heavy metal guitarist Kostas Karamitroudis (born 1980)

Fictional characters

Gus Aitoro, a character in Guiding Light
Gus Borden, a character in Get a Life
Gus Carmichael, a character in Tracy Beaker Returns
Gus Charnley, a character in Born to Be Wild
Gus Cruikshank, a character in Love
Gus Duncz, a character in Mission Hill
Gus Fring, a character in Breaking Bad
Gus Gold, a character in the 1989 American action comedy movie Speed Zone
Gus Goose, Donald Duck's second cousin
Gus Gorman, a character in Superman III
Gus Grav, former antagonist from the animated series Bakugan: New Vestroia and Bakugan: Mechtanium Surge
Gus Grimly, a character in Fargo
Gus Griswald, a character in Recess
Gus Hedges, a character in Drop the Dead Donkey
Gus McCrae, the main character in Lonesome Dove
Gus Matthews, the main character in the film The Benchwarmers
Professor Gus Nikolais, a character in Lorenzo's Oil 
Gus Polinski, the lead musician of a polka band in Home Alone
Gus Porter, a character in The Owl House
 Gus Smith, a character in The Birth of a Nation 
Gus Smith, a character in Eastenders
 Augustus "Gus" Waters, a character in The Fault in Our Stars
Gus, one of two mice sidekicks in Cinderella
Gus, a character in Cats
Gus, The mascot for the Minor League Baseball team Fredericksburg Nationals.
Gus, a character in Psych
Gus the groundhog, "spokesgroundhog" for the Pennsylvania Lottery
Gus, a character in Robotboy
Gus, a character in Andi Mack
Gus, the fireman in Leave It to Beaver
Gus, the bartender in The Cleveland Show
Gus Honeybun, a rabbit who was a mascot for ITV franchises Westward and TSW
Gus, a character in A Troll in Central Park
Gus, a character in Crazy Taxi
Gus the forklift driver, from the video game Half-Life
Gus, a character in Sweet Tooth
Gus the Gummy Gator, a character in Ryan's World
Gus, a character in Groundhog Day
Gus, the main character in The Ref
Mr. Gus from Uncle Grandpa
 Gus, a sometimes generated name in Pit People

Other
Gus (1976 film), about a football-playing mule
 Gus, a polar bear at the Central Park Zoo in New York City (1985-2013)
 GUS the eagle, mascot of Georgia Southern University

See also
Gussie

Lists of people by nickname
English-language masculine given names
Hypocorisms
English masculine given names